Sri Paduka Dato' Bendahara Paduka Raja Tun Koris ibni Almarhum Dato' Bendahara Paduka Raja Tun Abdul Majid (died 11 March 1806) was the 23rd Bendahara of Johor Sultanate and the third Raja Bendahara of the Pahang Kingdom who reigned from 1803 to 1806.

Bendaharaship
Tun Koris is the third son of the 19th Bendahara of Johor Tun Abdul Majid who succeeded on the death of his elder brother, Tun Muhammad who was drowned at sea off the coast of Endau.  

Tun Muhammad's 40 ship-mates escaped with their lives from the shipwreck, only to meet a worse fate. When they arrived at Pekan, all but two of them were slaughtered by Tun Koris, because they had not died with their prince. They were stabbed to death with a long kris. Koris's treatment of the ship-wrecked survivors earned him a well-merited reputation of cruelty. 

The new Bendahara had been reared at Endau by his Bugis mother and made Tuan Jambul his chief minister. His rule however, was short. He died in 1806 leaving behind two sons and a daughter. He was succeeded by his son, Tun Ali.

References

Bibliography

 

Sultans of Pahang
1806 deaths
19th-century monarchs in Asia
House of Bendahara of Johor